Kondapalkala is a major panchayat village located in the district of Karimnagar, Telangana, India.
It is located in Manakondur mandal. It is situated about 15 km from Lower Manair Dam, Karimnagar. It is reachable through road via 9 km from Chengerla which is on Karimnagar-Warangal State Highway.

References 

Villages in Karimnagar district